These are the full results of the 1996 Ibero-American Championships in Athletics which took place on May 9–11, 1996 on Estadio Alfonso Galvis Duque in Medellín, Colombia.

Men's results

100 meters

Heats – May 10Wind:Heat 1: +3.0 m/s, Heat 2: +2.7 m/s, Heat 3: +4.1 m/s

Final – May 10Wind:+1.5 m/s

Extra – May 11Wind:+1.1 m/s

200 meters

Heats – May 11Wind:Heat 1: -2.1 m/s, Heat 2: -1.6 m/s, Heat 3: -2.2 m/s

Final – May 12Wind:-2.7 m/s

400 meters

Heats – May 10

Final – May 11

Extra – May 10

800 meters

Heats – May 11

Final – May 12

1500 meters
May 11

5000 meters
May 12

10,000 meters
May 10

110 meters hurdles

Heats – May 11Wind:Heat 1: 0.0 m/s, Heat 2: 0.0 m/s

Final – May 11Wind:-0.1 m/s

400 meters hurdles

Heats – May 11

Final – May 12

3000 meters steeplechase
May 11

4 x 100 meters relay
May 12

4 x 400 meters relay
May 12

20 kilometers walk
May 11

NB: Official report has Miguel Ángel Rodríguez (an athlete who competed almost exclusively at 50 km) as the winner in 1:25:36. This differs from the GBR Athletics winner, Jorge Segura as listed above.

High jump
May 11

Pole vault
May 11

Long jump
May 10

Triple jump
May 12

Shot put
May 10

Discus throw
May 11

Hammer throw
May 12

Javelin throw
May 12

Decathlon
May 10–11

Women's results

100 meters

Heats – May 10Wind:Heat 1: +3.2 m/s, Heat 2: +3.8 m/s

Final – May 10Wind:+1.0 m/s

Extra – May 11Wind:0.0 m/s

200 meters

Heats – May 11Wind:Heat 1: -1.9 m/s, Heat 2: -1.3 m/s

Final – May 12Wind:-1.1 m/s

400 meters

Heats – May 10

Final – May 11

Extra – May 10

800 meters
May 12

1500 meters
May 11

5000 meters
May 12

10,000 meters
May 10

100 meters hurdles
May 10Wind: +3.0 m/s

400 meters hurdles
May 12

4 x 100 meters relay
May 12

4 x 400 meters relay
May 12

10,000 meters walk
May 11

High jump
May 10

Long jump
May 11

Triple jump
May 12

Shot put
May 11

Discus throw
May 12

Hammer throw
May 10

Javelin throw
May 10

Heptathlon
May 10–11

References

Ibero-American Championships Results
Events at the Ibero-American Championships in Athletics